Haverfordwest County Association Football Club is a Welsh semi-professional football team based in Haverfordwest, Wales. They currently play in the Cymru Premier, the top flight of Welsh football.

The club was founded in 1899 and was variously known as Haverfordwest FC, Haverfordwest Town, and Haverfordwest Athletic before adopting the current name, and plays at the Ogi Bridge Meadow Stadium, Haverfordwest, which accommodates 2,000 spectators.

History 
Haverfordwest Football Club was formed in 1899, and was quickly renamed Haverfordwest Town in 1901. In 1936, the name of Haverfordwest Athletic was adopted and the first team switched to the Welsh Football League, leaving a reserve side in the Pembrokeshire League. In 1956 they gained promotion to the Welsh League Premier Division, having won the First Division title. The present name of Haverfordwest County was adopted and the club embarked on a long stay in the top flight. Disaster struck in 1975–76 when the club won only four league matches and was relegated to the First Division. Promotion eluded them until 1980 and they went on to take the championship in their first season back, losing only five games.

In 1983 the Welsh League was reorganised to create a form of "premiership" for the leading clubs and Haverfordwest's facilities, administration and playing record secured their admittance. In the nine years of existence of this National Division, Haverfordwest were out of the top six only once, but their way to the title was blocked by the powerful Barry Town side. Their opportunity to take the championship came in 1990, once Barry had decided to move to English non-league football.

Haverfordwest County were founder members of the League of Wales in 1992–93 but their stay was brief. Having accepted an offer which involved the redevelopment of their Bridge Meadow ground, and unable to find a suitable alternative ground of League of Wales standard, they resigned from the League in 1994. The decision to take a long-term view was fully vindicated by their return to the League of Wales three years later. The league has since changed its name to the Welsh Premier League.

In 2004 Haverfordwest County qualified for Europe via league position in the League of Wales and played in the UEFA cup losing over two legs 4–1 to Fimleikafelag Hafnarfjardar of Iceland.

In the 2010–11 season Haverfordwest County were involuntarily relegated from the Welsh Premier League for the first time.  On 5 May 2015, they were promoted back to the Welsh Premier League following an unlikely 5–0 victory against Aberdare Town.

Rivalries 
Haverfordwest County's main rivals are Carmarthen Town A.F.C. with the rivalry described as among the most hostile in Welsh League football. Known as 'The A40 Derby', which is the principal dual carriageway between the 2 towns, it is a match that always sticks out of the fixture list for the bluebirds. Haverfordwest County supporters often like to remind their neighbours about their 4-0 win away at Carmarthen on 8 December 2000, being Carmarthen's biggest home loss against any club since they were founded in 1950.

Current squad

Staff

European Competitions

Honours 

Cymru Premier / Welsh Premier League
Best ever finish Third in 2003–04
Welsh Cup
Best performance Semi-finalists in 2004–05
FAW Premier Cup
Best performance Quarter-finalists in 2004–05
Welsh League Division 1 / Premier Division / National Division (Step 1)
Winners 1956–57, 1980–81, 1989–90
Runners-up 1969–70, 1970–71, 2014–15, 2017–18
Welsh League Division 1 (Step 2)
Winners 1979–80, 1996–97
Runners-up 1974–75, 1994–95, 1995–96
Welsh League Division 2 West (Step 2)
Winners 1955–56
Runners-up 1954–55
Welsh League Cup
Winners 1960–61, 1988–89
Runners-up 1974–75, 1984–85, 1996–97
Welsh League (Youth Division) Cup
Winners 2005–06
Runners-up 2010–11
West Wales Senior Cup
Winners 1981–82, 1988–89, 1991–92, 1992–93, 1997–98, 1998–99, 2005–06
Runners-up 1937–38, 1949–50, 1956–57, 1958–59, 1960–61, 1980–81
Pembrokeshire League Senior Cup (Reserves)
Runners-up 1956–57, 1960–61, 1961–62, 1966–67
Pembrokeshire League Wiltshire Cup (Reserves)
Winners 1969–70
Pembrokeshire League Division 1 (Reserves)
Winners 1960–61
Pembrokeshire League Division 2 (Reserves)
Winners 1999–00, 2005–06
Runners-up 1954–55, 1998–99
Pembrokeshire League Division 2 Cup (Reserves)
Runners-up 1974–75
Pembrokeshire League Division 3 (Reserves)
Winners 2003–04
Runners-up 1980–81
Pembrokeshire League Division 4 (Reserves)
Runners-up 1991–92
Pembrokeshire League Division 4 Cup (Reserves)
Runners-up 1991–92
Pembrokeshire League Division 5 (Reserves)
Runners-up 1990–91
Pembrokeshire League Division 5 Cup (Reserves)
Winners 1990–91
Pembrokeshire League Junior Division (Under-18s)
Runners-up 1970–71

Biggest Victories 
Biggest Cymru Premier Home Win: 6-1 v Cefn Druids in 2022
Biggest Cymru Premier Away Win: 0-6 v Aberystwyth Town FC in 2022

References

External links 

Cymru Premier clubs
Football clubs in Wales
Association football clubs established in 1899
1899 establishments in Wales
Haverfordwest
Welsh Football League clubs
Pembrokeshire League clubs
Cymru South clubs